Garrick is a personal name, and is both a surname and a given name (usually masculine). 

It originated in Old English and/or French. Old English garrick means "one who governs with a spear", or "spear king". In French, garric is derived from an Occitan word meaning "oak tree grove". 

People with the name Garrick include:

Given name

Garrick Dowhen
 Garrick Hagon
 Garrick Ibbotson
 Garrick Morgan (born 1970), former Australian rugby footballer
 Garrick Ohlsson
 Garrick Palmer
 Garrick Tremain (born 1941), New Zealand cartoonist and painter
 Garrick Utley

Surname

 Barbara Garrick (born 1965), American actress

 David Garrick (1717–1779), English actor
 David Garrick (singer) (1945–2013), English singer
 Edward Garrick (1757-?), instigator of the Boston Massacre
 Francis James Garrick (1833–1890), New Zealand politician
 Horrie Garrick (1918–1982), Australian politician
 Jack Garrick (1928–1999), New Zealand zoologist
 John Garrick (1902–1966), British film actor
 Jordon Garrick (born 1998), Jamaican footballer
 Jay Garrick, a DC Comics superhero and the first to use the name Flash
 Leon Garrick (born 1976), Jamaican cricketer
 Martin Garrick (born 1953), American politician
 Michael Garrick (born 1933), English pianist and composer
 Neville Garrick, Jamaican graphic artist, photographer, filmmaker, and writer
 Richard Garrick (1878–1962), American director and actor
 Stanley Garrick (1888–1958), Kingdom of Benin senior administrator and courtier
 Tom Garrick (born 1966), American basketball player